Rosenbergs Arkitekter is a Swedish architecture company founded in 1955 by Gustav Rosenberg and then Olle Stål and Hans Rosenberg, and then owned and led since 1992 by architects Alessandro Ripellino and Inga Varg. The company works with public and civic buildings, residential developments, work places, retail buildings, interiors and urban planning.

Portfolio and activities

The company has built up a considerable reputation through carrying out large projects in a distinctive style of soft structuralism. Initially Rosenbergs worked predominantly with public buildings
and large office blocks, but over the last couple of decades the company has broadened the range of its work to include city planning projects and large residential developments.

Some of their achievements include Lindhagsskrapan, a 24-storey residential tower block in the Kvarteret Lusten district of Stockholm; the award-winning Flat Iron Building at Norra Bantorget in central Stockholm; the Bankhus 90 building in Rissne, a key office building for Skandinaviska Enskilda Banken AB (SEB) one of Sweden’s major banks; the Tomteboda postterminalen building in Solna, one of the largest single buildings in Sweden and the corporate headquarters and main sorting office for Posten AB and PostNord AB, the Nordic region’s largest mail and logistics provider; the high-rise Rica Talk hotel in Stockholm and Stockholmsmässan, one of the country’s largest exhibition halls and conference centers, which Rosenberg’s has been responsible for the architectural creation and development of since the late 1990s.

Rosenbergs is currently working with many of the largest ongoing city planning projects taking place in Stockholm. Amongst other projects the company has submitted proposals for the expansion of the dense Västra city commercial area in central Stockholm; has won the contract for the urban redevelopment of the former racecourse area of Täby and won an open assignment to plan the
conversion of the Södra Värtahamnen area of Stockholm into a new district. The company is also working on many ongoing housing projects currently under construction, including apartment
blocks in Norra Djurgårdensstaden, Lilla Essingen and Telefonplan, residential high-rises in the tidningskvarteret district, Stadshagen and Borås, a residential tower block in Liljeholmen and
residential conversions in the Kabelverket district of Älvsjö.

Awards for buildings designed by Rosenbergs Arkitekter

2012: Lindhagsskrapan building nominated for Stockholm City Council’s building of the year award (Årets Stockholmsbyggnad.)
2012: Lindhagsskrapan building nominated for Swedish Concrete Federation’s annual architecture award (Svensk Betongs arkitekturpris)
2012: AE-Hallen section of Stockholmsmässan wins International Galvanizing Awards
2010: Flat Iron Building wins Swedish Concrete Federation’s annual architecture award (Svensk Betongs arkitekturpris)
2009: Flat Iron Building nominated for Stockholm City Council’s building of the year award (Årets Stockholmsbyggnad 2012.)
2008: Rica Talk Hotel wins architecture award of the Federation of Swedish Glazing Contractors (Glasbranschförengingen glaspris.)
2006: Rica Talk Hotel wins Stockholm Regional Heritage Federation’s architecture award (Stockholm läns hembygdsförbund.)
2003: Zanderska huset, new training facility at medical university Karolinska institutet in Flemingsberg, nominated for the Swedish Association of Architects’ Kasper Salin Award (Kasper Salin-priset)
2000: Ericsson R&D building in Mjärdevi Science Park, Linköping nominated for Swedish Concrete Federation’s annual architecture award (Svensk Betongs arkitekturpris)
2000: Stockholmsmässan awarded sign of the year (årets skylt) prize by Stockholm City Council (a prize for the most beautiful and effective neon signage in the city) for an integrated solution built around the interaction of façade, signage and lighting.
1994: Tekniska Verken offices in Linköping win prestigious Swedish Association of Architects’ Kasper Salin Award (Kasper Salin-priset.)
1992: Bankhus 90 wins architecture award of the Betongelementföreningen.
1986: IBM General Services Center in Kista wins the Partek Höganäs Ceramics Award for the design and creation of its façade.
1982: Tomteboda postterminalen corporate headquarters for Posten AB wins Tengbomspriset.
1975: Sollentuna Swimming Center and Sports Hall wins Kasper Salin-priset, the Swedish Association of Architects’ Kasper Salin Award.

Notable projects

Specific buildings
2011 Lindhagsskrapan, Kvarteret Lusten
1999-2010 Stockholmsmässan; AE-hallen (2009), C-hallen (1999), B-galleriet (2010)
2011 Punkthus, Hökarängen
2010 Entréhuset, Marievik
2008 Flat Iron Building, Norra Bantorget, Västra city
2008 Apartment buildings in the Sjöfarten district of Hammarby Sjöstad
2006 Rica Talk Hotel, Älvsjö
2002 IT-universitetet Forum
2002 Elektronikbyn, Kista
2002 Zanderska huset, Campus Huddinge
1993 Tekniska Verken, Linköping
1992 Bankhus 90, Rissne
1985 IBM General Services Center Kista
1983 Tomteboda postterminal, Solna
1972 Sollentuna Swimming Center and Sports Hall

Conversions, rebuilds and interiors
Sollentuna fria gymnasium (Sollentuna independent High School)
Hotel Birger Jarl
The Slussen Hilton, exterior lighting.

City planning
Täby Parkstad, new residential district on the site of the old racecourse.
Nya Klara Västra city, analysis, exploration and proposals for new building possibilities in dense area of central Stockholm.
Munksjön in Jönköping, new district.
Gubbängsfältet, residential and sports buildings.
Södra Värtahamnen, conversion into residential area
Studio Ulvsunda, residential properties in old industrial area
Gullmarsplan, a central meeting place in South Stockholm
Stockholmsfyren, draft proposals for Stockholm’s tallest building, in the Ropsten area.

Images

References

External links
Official website

Architecture firms of Sweden
Design companies established in 1992
Companies based in Stockholm